The first season of RuPaul's Secret Celebrity Drag Race premiered Friday, April 24, 2020 on VH1 (US). The four-part event series judging panel include RuPaul, Michelle Visage, Carson Kressley and Ross Mathews. The secret celebrities underwent a drag transformation and were mentored by Drag Race Royalty as "Queens Supremes".

This season resembles that of the main series - with each episode consisting of a mini-challenge (the winner of which earns an advantage in the maxi challenge), the maxi challenge and a lip-sync (which determines who is the winner of the week).

Contestants

Special guests 

Episode 2
Dolly Parton, singer

Episode 3
Love Connie, drag performer

Behind the scenes make-up artists
Shannel, contestant on season 1 and All Stars season 1
Laila McQueen, contestant on season 8
Mayhem Miller, contestant on season 10

Lip syncs

Episodes
</onlyinclude>

Ratings

References

External links
 Official site (in English)

2020 American television series debuts
2020s American LGBT-related television series
2020s American reality television series
American LGBT-related reality television series
American television spin-offs
Celebrity reality television series
Reality television spin-offs
RuPaul's Drag Race
Television series by World of Wonder (company)
VH1 original programming
Drag Race (franchise) seasons
2020 American television seasons